Whitehall Halt railway station served the town of Honiton, historically in Devonshire, England, from 1933 to 1963 on the Culm Valley Light Railway.

History 
The station was opened on 27 February 1933 by the Great Western Railway. It was situated on the west side of Station Road. It had a siding, although there were no freight facilities. Great Western Railway tickets showed it as Whitehall Crossing Halt. The station closed on 9 September 1963. Some of the platform still survives.

References 

Disused railway stations in Devon
Former Great Western Railway stations
Railway stations in Great Britain opened in 1933
Railway stations in Great Britain closed in 1963
1933 establishments in England
1963 disestablishments in England